João de Deus may refer to:

Johannes de Deo (died 1267), also called João de Deus, Portuguese canon law jurist
John of God (1495–1550), also called João de Deus, Portuguese soldier and saint
João de Deus de Nogueira Ramos (1830–1896), Portuguese poet and educator
João de Deus (actor) (1883–1951), Portuguese film actor in Brazil
João Teixeira de Faria (born 1942), also called João de Deus, Brazilian psychic
João de Deus (footballer) (born 1976), Portuguese football player and coach